John Davis (January 25, 1761 – January 14, 1847) was a delegate to the Massachusetts convention to ratify the United States Constitution, Comptroller for the United States Department of the Treasury, United States Attorney for the District of Massachusetts and a United States district judge of the United States District Court for the District of Massachusetts.

Education and career

Born on January 25, 1761, in Plymouth, Province of Massachusetts Bay, British America, Davis graduated from Harvard University in 1781 and read law in 1786. He was a delegate to the Massachusetts convention to ratify the United States Constitution in 1788. He was a member of the Massachusetts House of Representatives. He was a member of the Massachusetts Senate in 1795. He was Comptroller for the United States Department of the Treasury from 1795 to 1796. He was the United States Attorney for the District of Massachusetts from 1796 to 1801.

Federal judicial service

Davis was nominated by President John Adams on February 18, 1801, to a seat on the United States District Court for the District of Massachusetts vacated by Judge John Lowell. He was confirmed by the United States Senate on February 20, 1801, and received his commission the same day. On March 4, 1813, he swore in Elbridge Gerry as Vice President of the United States at Elbridge's home in Massachusetts. His service terminated on July 10, 1841, due to his resignation.

Death

Davis died on January 14, 1847, in Boston, Massachusetts.

Memberships

Davis was elected a Fellow of the American Academy of Arts and Sciences in 1792, Davis was also elected a member of the American Antiquarian Society in 1813.

See also
 Davis political family

References

Sources
 Johnson, Allen & Malone, Dumas (ed.'s). Dictionary of American Biography. vol. III. Charles Scribner's Sons, New York, N.Y. 1959.
 

1761 births
1847 deaths
Comptrollers of the United States Treasury
Fellows of the American Academy of Arts and Sciences
Members of the American Antiquarian Society
Harvard College alumni
Judges of the United States District Court for the District of Massachusetts
Massachusetts state senators
Members of the Massachusetts House of Representatives
Lawyers from Boston
People from Plymouth, Massachusetts
United States Attorneys for the District of Massachusetts
United States federal judges appointed by John Adams
18th-century American judges
People of colonial Massachusetts
United States federal judges admitted to the practice of law by reading law